"Schanzer Herz" is a single released by the German hard rock band Bonfire that had not appeared on a previously released album.  It was released in 2004 by LZ Records. The single was only available in Germany and was dedicated to the football team FC Ingolstadt 04, becoming the team's theme song. Two previously unreleased versions of "I Need You" and "Southern Winds" from the album Strike Ten are also featured. The female backing vocalist on "I Need You" is not credited.

Track listing

Band members
Claus Lessmann - lead vocals, rhythm guitar
Hans Ziller - lead, rhythm and acoustic guitars
Uwe Köhler - bass
Jürgen Wiehler - drums, percussion

References

2004 singles
Bonfire (band) songs
FC Ingolstadt 04
2004 songs